Duke of Buckingham held with Duke of Chandos, referring to Buckingham, is a title that has been created several times in the peerages of England, Great Britain, and the United Kingdom. There have also been earls and marquesses of Buckingham.

History

Dukes of Buckingham, first creation (1444)

The first creation of the dukedom was on 14 September 1444, when Humphrey Stafford, was made Duke of Buckingham.

On his father's side, Stafford was descended from Edmund de Stafford, who had been summoned to Parliament as Lord Stafford in 1299. The second Baron had been created Earl of Stafford in 1351. On his mother's side, Stafford was the son of Anne of Gloucester, Countess of Buckingham, daughter of Thomas of Woodstock, Earl of Buckingham (later Duke of Gloucester), youngest son of King Edward III of England. Stafford was an important supporter of the House of Lancaster in the Wars of the Roses, and was killed at the Battle of Northampton in July 1460.

The 1st Duke of Buckingham was succeeded by his grandson, Henry Stafford, 2nd Duke of Buckingham, who aided Richard III in his claiming the throne in 1483 (Edward IV of England's marriage to Elizabeth Woodville having been declared null and void and Edward's sons illegitimate by Act of Parliament Titulus Regius), but who then led a revolt against Richard and was executed later that same year. His titles were forfeited along with the dukedom.

His son, Edward Stafford, 3rd Duke of Buckingham, was restored to the title upon Henry VII's accession to the throne in 1485, but he was ultimately executed for treason in 1521 due to his opposition to Cardinal Thomas Wolsey, Henry VIII's chief advisor. At this time the title became extinct; it was posthumously attainted in 1523.

Dukes of Buckingham, second creation (1623)

The second creation of the dukedom was in 1623 for George Villiers, a favourite of James I of England. He had previously been made Baron Whaddon, of Whaddon in the County of Buckingham, and Viscount Villiers in 1616, then Earl of Buckingham in 1617, then Marquess of Buckingham in 1618 until he was also created Earl of Coventry and Duke of Buckingham in 1623. Buckingham, who continued in office as chief minister into the reign of James's son, Charles I, was responsible for a policy of war against Spain and France. In 1628 he was assassinated by  John Felton, a disgruntled army officer who had served under him, as he prepared an expedition to relieve the Huguenots of La Rochelle.

His son, George Villiers, 2nd Duke of Buckingham, was a notable advisor in the reign of Charles II, and along with Lord Ashley made up the Protestant axis of the famous Cabal Ministry. He started the first foxhunt in England, The Bilsdale Hunt in 1668 and later started the Sinnington Hunt in 1680. After digging for a fox above Kirkbymoorside, and being too far from his home in Helmsley, North Yorkshire, he died from a chill in the house of a tenant. With his death in 1687, the title again became extinct.

Several other members of the Villiers family have been elevated to the peerage. Christopher Villiers, 1st Earl of Anglesey, and John Villiers, 1st Viscount Purbeck, were brothers of the first Duke of Buckingham. Also, Edward Villiers, 1st Earl of Jersey, was the great-nephew of the first Duke of Buckingham while Thomas Villiers, 1st Earl of Clarendon, was the second son of the second Earl of Jersey.

Dukes of Buckingham, third creation (1703)

The third creation of the dukedom, as Duke of Buckingham and Normanby, was in 1703 for John Sheffield, 3rd Earl of Mulgrave, 1st Marquess of Normanby, a notable Tory politician of the late Stuart period, who served under Queen Anne as Lord Privy Seal and Lord President of the Council. The dukedom was created in the Peerage of England. The full title was Duke of the County of Buckingham and of Normanby but in practice only Duke of Buckingham and Normanby was used. The duke's family descended from Sir Edmund Sheffield, second cousin of Henry VIII, who in 1547 was raised to the Peerage of England as Baron Sheffield and in 1549 was killed in the streets of Norwich during Kett's Rebellion.

On the death of the 2nd Duke of Buckingham and Normanby in 1735, the titles became extinct. The Sheffield family estates passed to the 2nd Duke's half-brother Charles Herbert Sheffield, the illegitimate son of the 1st Duke by Frances Stewart. He was created a Baronet in 1755 and is the ancestor of the Sheffield Baronets, of Normanby.

Dukes of Buckingham, fourth creation (1822)

The fourth creation of the dukedom, as Duke of Buckingham and Chandos in the Peerage of the United Kingdom, was in 1822 for Richard Temple-Grenville, 2nd Marquess of Buckingham, a landowner and politician.

He was the son of George Nugent Temple Grenville, 3rd Earl Temple, who was the son of Prime Minister George Grenville, and who had been created Marquess of Buckingham in the peerage of Great Britain in 1784. The 1st Marquess of Buckingham had married Lady Mary Nugent, daughter of Robert Nugent, 1st Earl Nugent. Mary was in 1800 created Baroness Nugent in her own right in the Peerage of Ireland, with remainder to her second son George (see the Baron Nugent). In 1788 Lord Buckingham also succeeded his father-in-law as second Earl Nugent according to a special remainder in the letters patent, and at the same time assumed by Royal licence the additional surname of Nugent.

After the 1st Marquess of Buckingham's death in 1813, his titles passed to his son Richard Temple-Grenville, 2nd Marquess of Buckingham. He married Lady Anne Eliza Brydges, the only child of James Brydges, 3rd Duke of Chandos (a title which became extinct on his death in 1789), and assumed by Royal licence the additional surnames of Brydges-Chandos in 1799. In 1822 Lord Buckingham was created Earl Temple of Stowe, in the County of Buckingham, Marquess of Chandos and Duke of Buckingham and Chandos, all in the Peerage of the United Kingdom. The earldom was created with remainder, failing male issue of his own, to (1) the heirs male of the body of his deceased great-grandmother Hester Grenville, 1st Countess Temple, and (2) in default thereof to his granddaughter Lady Anne Eliza Mary Temple-Nugent-Brydges-Chandos-Grenville, daughter of his son Richard, who succeeded as second Duke in 1839.

After the 2nd Duke of Buckingham and Chandos' death in 1861, the titles passed to his son, the third Duke. He was also a prominent politician and served as Lord President of the Council and as Secretary of State for the Colonies. In 1868 the Duke established his right to the Scottish lordship of Kinloss before the Committee for Privileges of the House of Lords. On his death in 1889 without male issue, the dukedom and its subsidiary titles (the marquessate of Buckingham, marquessate of Chandos, earldom of Temple and earldom of Nugent) became extinct. The lordship of Kinloss passed to his daughter Mary. The earldom of Temple of Stowe passed to his sister's son William Temple-Gore-Langton because the title had been created with a special remainder to her heirs male. The viscountcy of Cobham, which had also been created with a special remainder, passed to Charles Lyttelton, 5th Baron Lyttelton, a descendant of Hester Grenville, 1st Countess Temple's sister Christian, who had married Sir Thomas Lyttelton, 4th Baronet.

List of title holders

Dukes of Buckingham (1444)

Humphrey Stafford, 1st Duke of Buckingham (1402–1460), created Duke of Buckingham in 1444
Humphrey Stafford, Earl of Stafford (1425–1458), eldest son of the 1st Duke, predeceased his father
Henry Stafford, 2nd Duke of Buckingham (1455–1483), only son of Lord Stafford, was attainted for treason in 1483
Edward Stafford, 3rd Duke of Buckingham (1477–1521), eldest son of the 2nd Duke, was restored to his father's honours in 1485, but then executed for treason in 1521 and posthumously attainted in 1523

Dukes of Buckingham (1623)
George Villiers, 1st Duke of Buckingham (1592–1628), created Duke of Buckingham and Earl of Coventry in 1623
George Villiers, 2nd Duke of Buckingham (1628–1687), younger son of the 1st Duke

Dukes of Buckingham and Normanby (1703)

John Sheffield, 1st Duke of Buckingham and Normanby (1648–1721), created Duke of Buckingham and Normanby in 1703
John Sheffield, Marquess of Normanby (1710)
Robert Sheffield, Marquess of Normanby (1711–1714)
Edmund Sheffield, 2nd Duke of Buckingham and Normanby (1716–1735)

Dukes of Buckingham and Chandos (1822)

Richard Temple-Nugent-Brydges-Chandos-Grenville, 1st Duke of Buckingham and Chandos (1776–1839), created Duke of Buckingham and Chandos in 1822
Richard Temple-Nugent-Brydges-Chandos-Grenville, 2nd Duke of Buckingham and Chandos (1797–1861)
Richard Temple-Nugent-Brydges-Chandos-Grenville, 3rd Duke of Buckingham and Chandos (1823–1889)

See also
Duchess of Buckingham
Earl of Anglesey (1623 creation)
Viscount Purbeck
Earl of Jersey
Earl of Clarendon (1776 creation)

Extinct dukedoms in the Peerage of England

Buckingham
Forfeited dukedoms in the Peerage of England
Noble titles created in 1444
Noble titles created in 1623